The 1939 TCU Horned Frogs football team represented Texas Christian University (TCU) in the 1939 college football season. The team was coached by Dutch Meyer in his sixth year as head coach, finishing the season with a 3–7 record after winning the national championship the season before. The team scored 11.6 points per game while the defense allowed 11.9 points per game. The Horned Frogs played their home games in Amon G. Carter Stadium, which is located on campus in Fort Worth, Texas.

Schedule

References

TCU
TCU Horned Frogs football seasons
TCU Horned Frogs football